Denefield School is a coeducational secondary school and sixth form located in Tilehurst (near Reading) in Berkshire, England.

History 
The school was founded in 1976 and was originally called Long Lane Comprehensive School after its location. This name was later changed to avoid confusion with a primary school of the same name on the same road.

When founded, the school had an enrolment of 180 students in Year 7 which was greatly increased the following year when all the students from Cintra Secondary Modern School joined after that school closed.

The Sixth form took its first students in 1981. Over the years Denefield has continued to grow and by 1992 when it became a grant-maintained school it had over 1,000 students on roll. It was awarded a specialism as a Technology College in 1994.

In 1999, Denefield became a foundation school and in January 2012, Denefield became an academy.

Ofsted judgements

The school was judged Good with outstanding features in 2005;Satisfactory in 2010. In 2012 it was judged Inadequate. In 2014 it was inspected again and judged Good. It was judged as Good following a short inspection in January 2018.

Building
The original school building was erected in 1976 as temporary accommodation, however, the old building still stands and much of the school has been rebuilt and refurbished. The school has  facilities for Science, Technology, Art and Music and has large grounds which are used for sporting activities.
The school was graded 'good' in its last Ofsted inspection in January 2018.

Headteachers

References

External links
Denefield School Website

Secondary schools in West Berkshire District
Tilehurst
Educational institutions established in 1976
1976 establishments in England
Academies in West Berkshire District